STTSS may refer to:
Sabah Tshung Tsin Secondary School, Kota Kinabalu, Sabah, Malaysia
Shatin Tsung Tsin Secondary School, Sha Tin, Hong Kong

See also 

 Service Tunnel Transport System, expressed as STTS